Eriastichus is a genus of hymenopteran insects of the family Eulophidae.

Species 

 Eriastichus acribis Hansson, 2021
 Eriastichus aphritis Hansson, 2021
 Eriastichus cigdemae LaSalle, 1994 
 Eriastichus cluridis Hansson, 2021
 Eriastichus coelotis Hansson, 2021
 Eriastichus colenis Hansson, 2021
 Eriastichus copalensis Hansson, 2021
 Eriastichus daptilis Hansson, 2021
 Eriastichus decoris Hansson, 2021
 Eriastichus denotatis Hansson, 2021
 Eriastichus derilis Hansson, 2021
 Eriastichus diadrys Hansson, 2021
 Eriastichus dotaensis Hansson, 2021
 Eriastichus drupis Hansson, 2021
 Eriastichus ebulis Hansson, 2021
 Eriastichus egrestis Hansson, 2021
 Eriastichus eleagnis Hansson, 2021
 Eriastichus ellipsis Hansson, 2021
 Eriastichus eminis Hansson, 2021
 Eriastichus facilis Hansson, 2021
 Eriastichus fenestris Hansson, 2021
 Eriastichus follis Hansson, 2021
 Eriastichus galeatis Hansson, 2021
 Eriastichus geratis Hansson, 2021
 Eriastichus glanis Hansson, 2021
 Eriastichus hilaris Hansson, 2021
 Eriastichus johnlasallei Hansson, 2021
 Eriastichus johnnoyesi Hansson, 2021
 Eriastichus maniatis Hansson, 2021
 Eriastichus masneri LaSalle, 1994 
 Eriastichus nakos LaSalle, 1994
 Eriastichus nebulis Hansson, 2021
 Eriastichus neonis Hansson, 2021
 Eriastichus nexilis Hansson, 2021
 Eriastichus novalis Hansson, 2021
 Eriastichus nugalis Hansson, 2021
 Eriastichus oasis Hansson, 2021
 Eriastichus ononis Hansson, 2021
 Eriastichus orestis Hansson, 2021
 Eriastichus pallidops Hansson, 2021
 Eriastichus parabilis Hansson, 2021
 Eriastichus renodis Hansson, 2021
 Eriastichus rivalis Hansson, 2021
 Eriastichus sannionis Hansson, 2021
 Eriastichus scalaris Hansson, 2021
 Eriastichus sodalis Hansson, 2021
 Eriastichus taraxis Hansson, 2021
 Eriastichus tendrilis Hansson, 2021
 Eriastichus tonioazofeifai Hansson, 2021
 Eriastichus velaminisand Hansson, 2021
 Eriastichus vestis Hansson, 2021

References
 ''Eriastichusucr.edu/~heraty/Eulophidae/index.html Key to Nearctic eulophid genera
 Universal Chalcidoidea Database

Eulophidae